Okenite (CaSi2O5·2H2O) is a silicate mineral that is usually associated with zeolites. It most commonly is found as small white "cotton ball" formations within basalt geodes.  These formations are clusters of straight, radiating, fibrous crystals that are both bendable and fragile. It also belongs to the family of the calcium silicate hydrates (C-S-H) commonly found in hardened cement paste. In cement chemist notation (CCN) it is noted as CaO·2SiO2·2H2O and abbreviated as CS2H2.

Discovery and occurrence
It was first described in 1828 for an occurrence at Disko Island, Greenland and named for German naturalist Lorenz Oken (1779–1851).

Minerals associated with okenite include apophyllite, gyrolite, prehnite, chalcedony, goosecreekite and many of the mother zeolites.
Okenite is found in India, mainly within the state of Maharashtra. Other localities include Bulla Island, Azerbaijan; Aranga, New Zealand; Chile; Ireland and Bordo Island in the Faroe Islands.

See also
 List of minerals named after people

References 

Calcium minerals
Hydrates
Phyllosilicates
Triclinic minerals
Minerals in space group 2